Gustave Ravier (1850-1918) was a French politician.

Early life
Gustave Ravier was born on 9 November 1850 in Cosne-Cours-sur-Loire, France.

Career
He served as a member of the Chamber of Deputies from 1906 to 1910.

Death
He died on 12 April 1918 in Savigny-en-Sancerre, France.

References

1850 births
1918 deaths
People from Nièvre
Politicians from Bourgogne-Franche-Comté
Radical Party (France) politicians
Members of the 9th Chamber of Deputies of the French Third Republic